The Village is a neighborhood in the western section of Historic Downtown in Jersey City.  It is bordered by Hamilton Park and Harsimus Cove to the east and the Turnpike Extension to the west, on the other side of which Jones Park and Mary Benson Park are located. Newark Avenue is the major street across the Village from  Grove Street at the east to Bergen Hill at the west. The neighborhood for many years was considered the city's "Little Italy" neighborhood.  Brunswick Street, between 1st and 10th Streets was once full of merchants and nicknamed "Bushel Avenue". St. Anthony of Padua Roman Catholic Church at 457 Monmouth St. received its historic designation on March 22, 2004.

See also
White Eagle Hall
Harsimus Stem Embankment
The Horseshoe
List of neighborhoods in Jersey City, New Jersey
National Register of Historic Places listings in Hudson County, New Jersey

References

External links
 Village Neighborhood Association (VNA) Website

Neighborhoods in Jersey City, New Jersey
Italian-American culture in New Jersey
Little Italys in the United States
Ethnic enclaves in New Jersey